The Wales national football team represents Wales in international association football and is governed by the Football Association of Wales (FAW). Between 1980 and 1999 the side played 133 matches, the majority of which came against other European national teams. The British Home Championship, which had been held every year outside wartime since 1894, was disbanded in 1984. The decision to end the competition in its 100th year was blamed largely on low attendance figures, football hooliganism and England and Scotland's desire to play other opponents. Wales came within one match of winning the tournament in the 1980–81 season. They needed only to beat Northern Ireland, but the final game was never played after players refused to travel following an escalation of The Troubles in Ireland. Northern Ireland won the last tournament, held in the 1983–84 season, on goal difference as all four sides finished on equal points.

During this time period, Wales also saw an improvement in their hopes of qualifying for a major tournament. They came close to qualifying for both the 1982 FIFA World Cup, losing out on goal difference to Czechoslovakia, and the 1984 European Championships. In the latter, a late goal for Yugoslavia in their final match against Bulgaria saw them overtake Wales to win the qualifying group. Wales narrowly failed to qualify for the third consecutive tournament, the 1986 FIFA World Cup, as they drew a decisive qualifying match against Scotland. A defeat in their last qualifying game against Germany, coupled with their opponents' subsequent victories in their last matches, led to Germany winning the group and the resulting qualification place for the 1992 European Championships. A similar defeat against Romania in 1993 resulted in Wales failing to qualify for the 1994 FIFA World Cup.

Of the 133 matches played by Wales during the period, they won 47, drew 28 and lost the remaining 58. The team was most successful against Scotland, Iceland and the Republic of Ireland, winning three times against each side. They were least successful against the Netherlands, losing all five meetings between the sides and conceding 17 goals in the process. Their biggest victories were 6–0 wins over the Faroe Islands in 1992 and San Marino in 1996, while their biggest defeat was a 7–1 loss to the Netherlands, also in 1996.

Results
Wales' score is shown first in each case. The colours listed below are also used to signify results combined with the scoreline.

Head to head records

Notes

References 
Statistics 

 

Bibliography

Footnotes

1980s in Wales
1990s in Wales
1980s
1979–80 in Welsh football
1980–81 in Welsh football
1981–82 in Welsh football
1982–83 in Welsh football
1983–84 in Welsh football
1984–85 in Welsh football
1985–86 in Welsh football
1986–87 in Welsh football
1987–88 in Welsh football
1988–89 in Welsh football
1989–90 in Welsh football
1990–91 in Welsh football
1991–92 in Welsh football
1992–93 in Welsh football
1993–94 in Welsh football
1994–95 in Welsh football
1995–96 in Welsh football
1996–97 in Welsh football
1997–98 in Welsh football
1998–99 in Welsh football
1999–2000 in Welsh football